The 2022–23 East Carolina Pirates women's basketball team will represent East Carolina University during the 2022–23 NCAA Division I women's basketball season. The Pirates, led by fourth year head coach Kim McNeill, play their home games at Williams Arena at Minges Coliseum and are ninth year members of the American Athletic Conference.

Previous season 
The Pirates finished the 2021–22 season 11–18, 4–11 in AAC play to finish in a tie for last place. They lost in the first round of the American Athletic Conference women's tournament to Memphis.

Offseason

Departures
Due to COVID-19 disruptions throughout NCAA sports in 2020–21, the NCAA announced that the 2020–21 season would not count against the athletic eligibility of any individual involved in an NCAA winter sport, including women's basketball. This meant that all seniors in 2020–21 had the option to return for 2021–22.

Incoming transfers

Recruiting

Recruiting class of 2023

Media
All Pirates home and road games will have a video stream on ESPN+.

Roster

Schedule and results

|-
!colspan=12 style=| Non-conference regular season

|-
!colspan=12 style=| AAC regular season

|-
!colspan=12 style=|AAC Women's Tournament

|-
!colspan=12 style=|NCAA Tournament

Rankings

*The preseason and week 1 polls were the same.^Coaches did not release a week 2 poll.

See also
 2022–23 East Carolina Pirates men's basketball team

References

East Carolina
East Carolina
East Carolina Pirates women's basketball seasons
East Carolina Pirates women's basketball
East Carolina Pirates women's basketball